Cirrhilabrus cenderawasih is a species that is commonly on sheltered seaward reefs, in a world abundant with coral reefs and geographical landscapes.  The eastern portions of the Cenderawasih Bay it is more abundant below about 35 m, although at a depth between about 22 to 60 m. They are generally found in Western Pacific, Indonesia. These island groups are highly endemic reef fishes in multiple genera, it is observed around 10 to 20 individuals including one or five males were typically encountered on rubble substrates at the base of slopes. Male Cirrhilabrus cenderawasih is pinkish fading to white near the belly and is typical of the complex. They are yellow elongated blotch runs across the pink/white demarcation that starts from the pectoral fin up to about two-thirds of the body length. The female is complete pink with a single black caudal spot, otherwise, it would be difficult to identify without contextual clues. The length of male Cirrhilabrus cenderawasih is 6.5 cm SL and female 4.7 cm SL. Bird’s Head Peninsular lies in the northwest province of West Papua so it is named as head of a bird, and it is the epicenter of three important reefs.

References

Fish described in 2006
Taxa named by Gerald R. Allen
Taxa named by Mark van Nydeck Erdmann
cenderawasih